The Arc de Triomf is a triumphal arch in the city of Barcelona in Catalonia, Spain. It was built by architect Josep Vilaseca i Casanovas as the main access gate for the 1888 Barcelona World Fair. The arch crosses over the wide central promenade of the Passeig de Lluís Companys, leading to the Ciutadella Park that now occupies the site of the world fair. It is located at the northern end of the promenade, facing the Passeig de Sant Joan.

Design
The arch is built in reddish brickwork in the Neo-Mudéjar style. The front frieze contains the stone sculpture Barcelona rep les nacions (Catalan for "Barcelona welcomes the nations") by Josep Reynés. The opposite frieze contains a stone carving entitled Recompensa ("Recompense"), a work from Josep Llimona's earliest period, representing the granting of awards to the participants in the World Exposition. The friezes along the sides of the arch include allegories of agriculture and industry by Antoni Vilanova and of trade and art by Torquat Tassó. The two pillars of the arch feature bats carved in stone, which were the emblem of King Jaume I, who ruled over a period of prosperity in Barcelona.

Other triumphal arches
Similar structures can be found in many other cities, most notably including the  Arc de Triomphe in Paris, the Wellington Arch in London, the Soldiers' and Sailors' Arch in New York City, and the Arcul de Triumf in Bucharest, plus many from the Roman era. This arch, however, is non-military. It does not celebrate the country's military victories, but rather was built as the gateway to the 1888 World Fair and was thus intended to welcome people.

See also

Arc de Triomf metro station
Arc de Triomf railway station

References

External links
 Brief description and history of Barcelona's Arc de Triomf on the official Barcelona Tourism site.
The Arc de Triomf on Google Maps

Buildings and structures in Barcelona
Terminating vistas
Triomf
Gates in Spain
Neo-Mudéjar architecture in Spain
Buildings and structures completed in 1888
World's fair architecture in Barcelona
1888 sculptures
Brick sculptures
Tourist attractions in Barcelona
Modernisme architecture in Barcelona